Shelton Lake is a lake located on Vancouver Island at the head of South Englishman River north west of Nanaimo Lakes.

Fishing

Wild populations of native coastal cutthroat trout are found in Shelton Lake.

References

Alberni Valley
Lakes of Vancouver Island
Dunsmuir Land District